Bitterman is a surname. Notable people with the surname include:

Chet Bitterman (c. 1953 – 1981), American linguist and Christian missionary
Mary G. F. Bitterman, President, The Osher Foundation
Rachel Bitterman

See also
Bittermann